Derwyddon Dr Gonzo were a Welsh-language funk and ska band from Llanrug, North Wales. Having reached number one in Siart C2 (Welsh Language Music Chart), their music has received airplay on BBC Radio Cymru, BBC Radio 1 and Serbian radio. The band performed regularly on the Welsh language scene circuit, in addition to larger festivals such as Latitude Festival, Wakestock, Sŵn, Sesiwn Fawr Dolgellau and Maes B at the National Eisteddfod. Their second EP, Chaviach/Bwthyn was released on the Copa Label in 2008. On 27 July 2009 the band released their second album, Stonk!, on the Copa label, and recorded at the Wings for Jesus Studio in Cardiff by Sir Doufus Styles.

Discography
Ffandango (2006)
K.O/Madrach (Ciwdod, 2007)
Chaviach/Bwthyn (Copa, 2008)
Stonk! (Copa, 2009)

Awards
Winners of Cymdeithas yr Iaith Gymraeg's Battle of the Bands competition in 2005
Best Live Band - Rock & Pop Awards, BBC Radio Cymru 2009
Best Band - Rock & Pop Awards, BBC Radio Cymru 2009

References

External links
Derwyddon Dr Gonzo's MySpace site
Live session on C2
Profile on BBC website

Welsh-language bands
British funk musical groups
Third-wave ska groups
Afro-beat musical groups